Praiwan Wannabutr (also known by the nickname Pearry or former Luang Phi Priwan Worrawanno; 2 October 1991 –) is a Thai influencer, writer and actor. He was a former Thai Buddhist monk between 2003 to 2021.

Early life 
He was born in poor family in Chanthaburi Province. He was the only son of his two parents. His early life was rather difficult because he is to ordination as a novice.

Buddhist monk life 
He entered the monkhood right after completing primary school. He first ordained as a novice in Sukhothai Province and by the age of 18 had achieved Level 7 in the study of Pali, language the language of the Therevada canon.

He then shifted to Wat Soi Thong in Bangkok to further his studies and became the first novice monk from Sukhothai to complete Level 9 in Pali – equivalent to a bachelor's degree. By the time he was 20, he was ordained as a monk under the auspices of King Bhumibol Adulyadej. He graduated two-second degrees from Mahachulalongkornrajavidyalaya University and Ramkhamhaeng University. He rent in Wat Soi Thong and he is buddhist professor in the Wat Soi Thong.

He populared by Buddhism sensation and appeared on Facebook Live together to deliver joint with Sompong Nakhonthaisong (Luang Phi Sompong Talbuddhadho). And the feedback was overwhelming, with more than 200,000 Facebookers making time to watch them. But to critics by the ultra-conservatism that they're make fun and trivializing the sacred teachings of Buddhism. However, their supporters think that they're want to presentation about Dhamma with the modern teach and don't make it to boried for Thai teenagers.

But that course is to farewell of Praiwan and Sompong in December 2021.

Present life
After he farewell from monk, he to started to entertainment and literature. He start to influencer and actor since February 2022. He clearly revealed that he is LGBTQ+. Maybe, he farewell to monk but he still live in his Facebook for critics about darkside of Thai Buddhism.

Filmography

Television dramas
 2023 Winyan Patsaya (วิญญาณแพศยา) (/Ch.8) as 

Television series
 20  (/Ch.) as 

Television sitcoms
 20  (/Ch.) as 

Films
 20  as 

MC
 Television 
 2023 : เกาข่าวเอามันส์ Every Monday to Friday at 9:40-10:25 a.m. and Saturday to Sunday at 10:10-10:55 a.m. On Air Ch.8 With ต๊ะ-ภัทรพล นิธิวรพล (January 2, 2023-)
 2023 : ฟาดหัวข่าว Every Saturday from 9:30-10:30 a.m. On Air Amarin TV With Willy McIntosh, Ratchanok Suwannaket (February 4, 2023-)

 Online 
 2021 : YouTube:ไพรวัลย์ [Official Channel]
 2022 : นินทาประเทศไทย On Air YouTube:NANAKE555 (2022)
 2022 : แย่งซีน EP.1 On Air YouTube:ช่อง8 : Thai Ch8

References

External links
 

Thai scholars of Buddhism
Thai social scientists
Praiwan Wannabutr
Thai male writers
Thai LGBT writers
LGBT Buddhists
People from Chanthaburi province
Ramkhamhaeng University alumni
Thai male actors
Thai male television actors
Thai television personalities
Thai YouTubers
1991 births
Living people
21st-century Thai male actors